Don M. Wilson III (born 1948) is an American banker with expertise in corporate banking, global capital markets, and risk management.  He was appointed as the first chief risk officer  at  JPMorgan Chase & Co. in 2003
 and retired in 
2006. He began his career in the management training program at Chemical Bank in New York (a predecessor institution) in 1973 and later held senior executive positions in New York, Tokyo, and London.

In 2008, Bank of Montreal, Canada's first bank, founded in 1817, appointed Wilson to its board of directors.  He is currently chair of the Risk Review Committee of the BMO Board.

In 2013, Wilson was awarded the Tuck Overseers Medal from the Tuck School at Dartmouth College.
 
A native of Ravenna, Ohio, he was inducted into the community's Ravenna Raven Hall of Fame in 1992.  He graduated as valedictorian at Ravenna High School in 1966.

He is vice chairman of the board of directors of Goodwill Industries of Greater New York and Northern New Jersey, Inc. and a member of the Council on Foreign Relations. He has served as a trustee of St. Bernard's School, a boys' private school. He has been a trustee at the Brick Presbyterian Church in Manhattan. Wilson served both as chairman of Tuck Annual Giving at the Tuck School at Dartmouth College and as an overseer at Tuck School for more than ten years. Since 2005 Wilson has served as chair of Leadership Giving and chair of Reunion Giving for the Harvard University Class of 1970.  In 2003 he was given the Albert H. Gordon '23 Award by the Harvard College Fund.  He currently serves on the Committee on University Resources at Harvard University.  For many years Wilson has served on the Museum & Archives Committee at the United States Golf Association, and he is Founding Trustee of the USGA Foundation.  In 2016 Wilson was elected to the board of directors of the Global Risk Institute in Toronto, Canada.

Wilson has an AB cum laude from Harvard University in 1970 and an MBA from Tuck School at Dartmouth College in 1973.  He married Lynn Suzanne Byron in 1984 and they have three children.  A fourth child died as an infant.

Wilson has edited, introduced, and published three books on his hometown ("Ravenna---A Bicentennial Album of 19th Century Photographs" (1999); "Here at My Window: Poems by Bernice Douglass" (2001); and, "Greetings from Ravenna: Picture Postcards, 1905-1925" (2009)).

Wilson has also edited, introduced, and published ten limited-edition golf history books (("Aspects of Some Nineteenth Century Golfing Pamphlets" (2005); "Walking the Fairways with Golf Artist Bill Waugh" (2008); "A Journey Through the Annals of The Golfing Annuals, 1888-1910" (2011); "Rarities in the Library of Golf: Selections from the 19th Century" (2013);  "Horace G. Hutchinson's 'Aspects of Golf'"(2015); "The Book of the Monifieth Golf Links Bazaar" (2016); "Selections from an Edwardian Golf Library, 1900-1914 (2017); "St Andrews Ancient & Modern, Selections" (2018); “Machrihanish ‘Machaire Shanais’, Golf 1880s-1920s” (2018); “Some Golf in 1888” (2019); and, working title: “The Library of Golf: Selections, 15th-18th Century” (2020).

References

American bankers
People from Ravenna, Ohio
Harvard University alumni
Tuck School of Business alumni
Directors of Bank of Montreal
1948 births
Living people
American corporate directors